Kate Church (born 27 March 1978) is an Australian Paralympian from Victoria who competed in swimming at the 2000 Summer Paralympic Games.

Australian Longcourse Swimming Records
 SB8 Open Women's 50m Breastroke, set 26 March 1999

References 

Female Paralympic swimmers of Australia
Swimmers at the 2000 Summer Paralympics
Living people
1978 births
Australian female medley swimmers
Australian female breaststroke swimmers
Sportspeople from Ballarat
S9-classified Paralympic swimmers